Zendan Chal (also Romanized as Zendān Chāl) is a village in Qaleh Qafeh Rural District, in the Central District of Minudasht County, Golestan Province, Iran. At the 2006 census, its population was 364, in 108 families.

References 

Populated places in Minudasht County